Bigger Thomas is a fictional character in the novel Native Son (1940) by American author Richard Wright.

In the original 1951 film, Bigger is played by Wright himself, while he is portrayed by Victor Love and Ashton Sanders in the 1986 film and 2019 film, respectively.

Darryl Lorenzo Washington wrote in The Crisis that the character's name suggests both Uncle Tom and the racial slur "nigger".

Original novel

Vincent Canby of The New York Times stated that Wright was aware "that he was taking a terrible chance with" the character.

The Bigger in the original novel comes from a low socioeconomic background. Troy Patterson of The New Yorker argued that the character in the novel is a "thoughtless lunk" and "social problem".

In all versions, Bigger accidentally kills Mary Dalton, the daughter of his boss.

In the novel and in the first film, Bigger additionally murders his girlfriend, Bessie Mears. Jerrold Freeman, director of the 1986 film, stated that "The scene is pivotal in the novel because it underscores the disintegration of Bigger Thomas, a victim of racism and segregation in Chicago of the 1930's who in turn becomes a victimizer."

Earlier drafts of the novel show that Mary sexually arouses Bigger, but these lines were removed from the final version. Louis Menand wrote in The New Yorker that in the final version, as a result of the cuts, "Bigger's sexuality has always been a puzzle. He hates Mary, and is afraid of her, but she is attractive and is negligent about sexual decorum, and the combination ought to provoke some sort of sexual reaction; yet in the familiar edition it does not."

University of California at Los Angeles associate English professor Richard Yarborough stated that "Wright didn't want him to be sympathetic, so he made him very brutal. Wright didn't want tears. He felt that pity would be an evasion." Yarborough added, "You can forgive Bigger for the accidental killing but not for the killing of Bessie." Soraya Nadia McDonald, in an article for The Undefeated, stated, "Needless to say, this is not a character who inspires sympathy."

Wright later wrote an essay called "How 'Bigger' Was Born", which was included as an introduction in reprints of the novel.

Film versions
Victor Love, who portrayed Bigger in the 1986 film, stated that his appearance and voice not being "street" meant that he did not feel he was initially seriously considered for the role. He was auditioning for Othello, which he did not get, when he was called to perform as Bigger. Love felt that Wright did not really mean for Bigger Thomas to be played unsympathetically and that instead he was afraid to ask people to care for Bigger. According to Love the filmmakers initially refused him the role, but later offered it to him. The 1986 Native Son film omits the murder of Bessie, and Yarborough described this version of Bigger as "much more a sympathetic victim". Canby wrote that this Bigger was acted "in such a passive way that Bigger Thomas never appears capable of taking charge of his own destiny, which is at the heart of Wright's terrifying fable."

The 2019 film version of Bigger lives in a middle class household. He has, as described by Patterson, "goth black" nail polish and "toxic green" dyed hair. He also enjoys reading Ralph Ellison books and is able to teach himself material. Anna Shechtman of The New Yorker wrote that the 2019 Bigger has a "confident style" stemming from Ellison and that this Bigger "has an assuredness that Wright, Love, and even the character that Wright originally wrote seemed to lack." In regards to the 2019 film, Patterson stated that this Bigger is "a bit adrift", "serious and cerebral", and "a late adolescent at loose ends". In the film, Bessie describes Bigger as "a fixer upper", reflecting that he has issues to work on. In this version, Bigger begins trying to choke Bessie but ultimately does not do it. Filmmaker Rashid Johnson explained that he removed Bessie's death from the film because having her survive would "give Bigger an opportunity to be both complicated and (empathetic) simultaneously, and that was just a step off of a cliff that didn't allow us to tell the story in a (contemporary) way that we thought would facilitate conversation."

Reception
Shechtman wrote that the character "was a disgrace" to middle class African-Americans, adding that liberal white Americans saw Bigger more positively as "a black antihero, claiming their interest and testing their sympathy". Canby concurred that middle class African-Americans saw the character negatively, adding that white people who held prejudice against blacks had their beliefs that black men were sexual threats confirmed by the character. Shechtman stated that, overall, the character "had quickly become lodged in the country's popular imagination."

Ellison wrote that "Bigger Thomas had none of the finer qualities of Richard Wright, none of the imagination, none of the sense of poetry, none of the gaiety. And I preferred Richard Wright to Bigger Thomas."

The initial release of the 1950 film was heavily edited. An African-American newspaper review described the edited film as "leaving the audience with no choice but to condemn" Bigger, due to omission of key characteristics.

Analysis
David Bradley wrote in The New York Times that, while he strongly disliked the novel upon first reading, "It wasn't that Bigger failed as a character, exactly", as Bradley knew of the author's intentions to make Bigger unlikable; rather, Bradley felt the author did not succeed in making Bigger symbolize ordinary black men. However, upon reading an edition of the book with an introduction, Bradley stated that "Suddenly I realized that many readers of Native Son had seen Bigger Thomas as a symbol". Upon researching other writings from the author, Bradley interpreted Bigger as Wright's autobiographical view of himself and subsequently began to see Native Son as a tragedy, despite this not being Wright's initial intention.

Owen Glieberman of Variety wrote that the character, "a badass before his time", "embodied a drive, a violence, that made him the link between Stagger Lee and Sweetback", and that this was the "power" of the original work.

References

Further reading

External links
 

Fictional African-American people
Fictional criminals
Male characters in literature